Bernard J. Baars (born 1946, in Amsterdam) is a former Senior Fellow in Theoretical Neurobiology at The Neurosciences Institute in San Diego, CA., and is currently an Affiliated Fellow there.

He is best known as the originator of the global workspace theory, a theory of human cognitive architecture and consciousness.  He previously served as a professor of psychology at the State University of New York, Stony Brook where he conducted research into the causation of human errors and the Freudian slip, and as a faculty member at the Wright Institute.

Baars co-founded the Association for the Scientific Study of Consciousness, and the Academic Press journal Consciousness and Cognition, which he also edited, with William P. Banks, for "more than fifteen years".

In addition to research on global workspace theory with Professor Stan Franklin and others, Baars is working to re-introduce the topic of the conscious brain into the standard college and graduate school curriculum, by writing college textbooks and general audience books, web teaching, advanced seminars and course videos.  Baars has also published on animal consciousness, volition, and feelings of knowing, and is currently working on an approach to "higher" states, as defined in the meditation traditions. New brain recording methods continue to reveal unexpected evidence on those topics.

Bibliography 

Bernard Baars: The cognitive revolution in psychology, NY: Guilford Press, 1986, .
Bernard Baars: A cognitive theory of consciousness, NY: Cambridge University Press 1988, .
Bernard Baars: The experimental psychology of human error: Implications for the architecture of voluntary control, NY: Plenum Press, Series on Cognition and Language, 1992, 
Bernard Baars: In the Theater of Consciousness: The Workspace of the Mind, NY: Oxford University Press, 1997, .
Bernard Baars and Nicole M. Gage: Cognition, Brain and Consciousness: An Introduction to Cognitive Neuroscience. (Second Edition). London: Elsevier/Academic Press, 2010.

References

External links
 Published articles as pdf downloads, with Stan Franklin and other coauthors
 Homepage
 Consciousness: The WebCourse

1946 births
Living people
American neuroscientists
Scientists from Amsterdam
Dutch emigrants to the United States
American consciousness researchers and theorists